Pip Hare is a British yachtswoman, journalist and sailing coach. She is an entrant in the 2020 Vendée Globe round-the-world yacht race.

Early life 
Hare grew up in East Anglia and began sailing at the age of 16.

Career 
Hare is a professional sailing coach and a writer for Yachting World. In 2013 she wrote and presented a YouTube series for the magazine, entitled “Sail Faster Sail Safer”.

Hare has competed in international yacht races such as the Transat Jacques Vabre and the Rolex Fastnet race. In 2009 she competed in the OSTAR transatlantic race. In 2017 Hare's team came third in the Three Peaks Yacht Race, despite Hare breaking her ankle 6 miles from the finish.

Vendée Globe 
In October 2018, after being offered the 1999 IMOCA 60 vessel Superbigou (on rental from fellow sailor Jaanus Tamme), Hare announced her campaign to enter the 2020-2021 Vendée Globe race. The race commenced in November 2020, and Hare was one of four entrants from the United Kingdom. Hare had chosen to base her campaign in Poole. She was sponsored in part by Smartsheet. Her target was to break the then-current female record of 94d 4h 25m set by Ellen MacArthur in 2001 Hare finished the race on 12 February 2021 in 95d 11h 37m 30s, in 19th place. During the same edition the record was broken by Clarisse Crémer in a time of (87d 2h 24m).

References

External links 
 Pip Hare Ocean Racing
 Official YouTube channel
 Pip HARE on IMOCA

1974 births
Living people
English female sailors (sport)
Class 40 class sailors
IMOCA 60 class sailors
British Vendee Globe sailors
2020 Vendee Globe sailors
Vendée Globe finishers
Single-handed circumnavigating sailors